Epidemic is the third EP from American rock band New Years Day. It is  their first and only release on the label Grey Area Records.

Background
For the EP, lead vocalist Ash Costello said in an interview with Alternative Press, "We've taken what we have experienced in the past year and a half and poured it all into these new songs.... It’s something we know everyone can relate to it on their own level. The world can infect us with its negativity, and it’s ok to struggle with it. That’s truly what Epidemic is about.  Owning the diseased parts of us and turning it into a strength."

Track listing

Personnel

Ashley Costello - lead vocals
Anthony Barro - bass, unclean vocals
Nikki Misery - guitars
Nick Rossi - drums
Erik Ron - producer, mixer, engineer
Eve Saint Raven - artwork

References 

2014 EPs
New Years Day (band) albums
Albums produced by Erik Ron